SoCal may refer to several institutions and places in the USA:

Places:
 Southern California, the southern portion of the state of California.

Institutions:
 The University of Southern California,  a private research university located in Los Angeles, California.
 Southern California TRACON, an air traffic control center for Southern California region under FAA.
 South Callaway High School, a public high school located in Mokane, Missouri.
Standard Oil Company of California (SOCal), today known as Chevron.

Miscellaneous:
 So Cal, a clothing brand owned by No Fear, Inc., marketed especially to youth and California residents.
 Standard Oil of California (SOCal), the company today known as Chevron
 SoCal Val, American professional wrestling valet, ringside attendant, backstage interviewer, occasional ring announcer  and TNA Knockout